Solastalgia is the fifth studio album by Australian singer-songwriter Missy Higgins, released on 27 April 2018. The album's title references an "existential distress caused by environmental change, such as mining or climate change".

The first single from the album, "Futon Couch", was released on 8 February 2018 with an accompanying video. The song has peaked at number 100 on the ARIA Singles Chart.

The album's second single "Cemetery" was released on 13 April 2018. The music video was released on 27 April 2018.

At the ARIA Music Awards of 2018, the album was nominated for the ARIA Award for Best Adult Contemporary Album.

Reception

Sophie Benjamin from The Australian said "Solastalgia'''s best moments come from Higgins taking a long look at the world she's bringing her children into, wrestling with the guilt and fear from that decision, then going to her piano to work out her feelings about it." adding "The album's weakest moments are when Higgins mines her past for inspiration and gets carried away with the bells and whistles of laptop production." Benjamin concluded that "Old fans who loved her early work may be put off by the electronic production, but it's worth pushing through any discomfort and sitting with Solastalgia, an album that only underscores her talent."

Liz Giuffre from The Music'' said "Although there's quite a bit of thematic doom and gloom on this record, expect plenty of highs, too", adding "A departure into the electro fringe, this is Missy Higgins as far away from organic/acoustic pop as she has ever ventured, and it's well worth the journey." Giuffre named the track "49 Candles" as the bold standout.

David from auspOp gave the album 4 out of 5, saying "Overall [Higgins] has created a collection of songs which are interesting, dynamic and lyrically intriguing." He also called the album "magical".

Track listing

Charts

Release history

References

2018 albums
Eleven: A Music Company albums
Missy Higgins albums